Jurupa Hills may refer to;

 Jurupa Mountains, in Southern California
 Jurupa Hills, a neighborhood in Jurupa Valley, California
 Jurupa Hills Country Club, in the Jurupa Hills neighborhood of Jurupa Valley
 Jurupa Hills High School, in Fontana, California
 Jurupa Hills Regional Park, in Fontana, California

See also
 Jurupa (disambiguation)